The Algeria national rugby union team represents Algeria in men's international rugby union. The team is administered by the Algerian rugby Federation (FAR). The first match they competed in was on the 24th February 2007, in a game in Tunis against the Tunisia national rugby union team (to which Algeria won by 8-7). While almost all current national team players play for clubs in the French championship, there are some national players who practice the sport in Australia, New Zealand, Romania and England. The first coach of the Algeria national rugby union team was Morad Kellal.

History

Before 2015 
Rugby was played on Algerian territory during French colonization. After this period, its practice decreased rapidly, until disappearing in 1972.
At the invitation of the Tunisia national rugby union team, Algeria brought together Nabeul a selection of the best Algerian players from rugby and started on the international stage On 27 February 2007 against Tunisia, a match that they won 8 to 7 Algeria, the Fennecs dream of having a federation with an attempt of Samir Khamouche playing at Castres and a penalty Of Nadir Boukhaloua playing Lyon OU. Later, the Algerians won 20 points to 17 against the hopes of the Stade français at the Villeneuve stadium of the commune of Clichy, department of Hauts-de-Seine, As well as against other African teams, including the Ivory Coast team., in the absence of a federation recognized by the Algerian State, it does not appear in the World Rugby Rankings and has not yet played an official meeting.

2015: return of rugby union in Algeria

Preparation of the setting up of official bodies 
Disappeared in the early 1970s, rugby found its place in Algeria. On January 1, 2015, after eight years of discussions and exchanges, the Ministry of Sports, assisted by the Algerian Olympic Committee, validates the creation of the National Algerian Rugby Association which will become the rugby union current 2015.

The objectives of this new body are the Rugby World Cup in 2019 in Japan, not forgetting the Africa Cup. With the recognition of the Federation, the selection can now appeal to players who play in the Top 14 to build a highly competitive national team. For Sofiane Abdelkader Benhassen, founder of the pilot club Stade Oranais in 2008, who has been appointed president, priority is also and above all to popularize the discipline in Algeria and to make this sport known to the youth of the country through the creation of schools.

Crescent Cup Rugby Championship 
On June 1, 2015, the Algerian Rugby Union team flew to Malaysia for the Crescent Cup Rugby Championship, their first official international competition., The Algerian rugby union team started its tournament with a 26–5 victory against the Kazakhstan team, ranked 39. He is victorious for the first official match in the history of the Algerian selection of rugby. Confirmation that the Algerian potential is indeed there. after the piece and against the same team again won 15–0 to qualify to the final to face the owner of the land shed Malaysian team stopped due to riots between the players.

Creation of the national federation 

On 17 November 2015, the federation was formally established in Algiers at a general assembly meeting chaired by Mustapha Larfaoui, Honorary President of the Algerian Olympic Committee Olympic and Sports Algerian and in the presence of 18 clubs representing 16 wilayas. Sofiane Benhassen is elected the first president of the Algerian rugby union (FAR). Membership in the continental federation Rugby Africa is planned in December 2016.

The first official match played under the auspices of the Algerian federation on December 18, 2015 Oran against the Tunisia. Salim and Djemaï Tebani are breeders of this first official meeting on Algerian soil. In Ahmed Zabana Stadium of Oran, Algeria won this game 16–6 with a team consisting mainly of players based in France and two players trained in Algerian clubs.

Launch of the Maghreb Tri-Nations 
In December 2016, the Algerian Rugby Federation in collaboration with Rugby Africa will organize the first edition of a Maghreb Tri-nations grouping Algeria, Tunisia national rugby union team and the Morocco national rugby union team. World Rugby has validated it, and the event will take place at Oran, Algeria.

Africa Cup 
The Algerian team, in their first participation in the tournament, signed in the North Group with Cameroon and Nigeria, but the Cameroonian team had been postponed through lack of organization that Rugby Africa disqualified Cameroon and suspended the activity of the country's federation for three months. which made the organizing committee to play a home-and-home series matches against Nigeria in Zambia, but the latter also withdrew to be a final Winner North vs Winner South against Zambia November 4, 2017 at Mufulira Leopards Rugby Club. in a historic match as the first official match to enable the Algerian team to win a 30–25 in the first defeat to Zambia in its home since 2002. the Algerian national team will play next season in the Rugby Africa Silver Cup.

Home grounds

Algeria play internationals since it first receives match on 2015 at Ahmed Zabana Stadium in Oran.

Record

Overall
Below is a table of the representative rugby matches played by an Algeria national XV at test level up until 10 July 2022

Rugby World Cup

Africa Cup

African Development Trophy

North African Tri Nations

Crescent Cup

Current squad
The following 45 players were called up for the 2021–22 Rugby Africa Cup matches against  Ghana and  Uganda.

Head coach:  Boumedienne Allam
 Caps Updated: 30 July 2021

Coaches

Current coaching staff
The current coaching staff of the Algerian national team:

Historical coaches
On 31 August 2021, the Senegalese Ousmane Mané was chosen by the FAR as the coach of the national selection succeeding to Boumedienne Allam.
Below is a list of historical coaches of the Algeria rugby union national team.

Individual all-time records

Most caps

Most tries

Most points

Most points in a match

Most tries in a match

See also
 Rugby union in Algeria
 Algerian rugby federation

References

External links
 Algerian rugby team statistics
 Algerian Rugby union Facebook page

 
African national rugby union teams
National team